The term Saudi International may refer to:

 Saudi International (golf)
 Saudi International (squash)